The Rue Saint-Lazare is a street in the 8th and 9th arrondissements of Paris, France. It starts at 9 Rue Bourdaloue and 1 Rue Notre-Dame-de-Lorette, and ends at Place Gabriel-Péri and Rue de Rome.

History

This street already existed in 1700 under the name of rue des Porcherons or rue d'Argenteuil, and connected the villages of Roule and Ville-L’Évêque to the village of Porcherons. 
In 1734 it was still only lined with few buildings.
The present name dates from 1770 and comes from the Maison Saint-Lazare toward which it led (via the rues Lamartine, Bleue, and Paradis) and which had been used as a leprosarium since the Middle Ages; it was converted into the Prison Saint-Lazare in 1793.
It stood at the current location of no 117 rue du Faubourg-Saint-Denis, in the 10th arrondissement.

A ministerial decision of 12 Fructidor V (29 August 1797) fixed the minimum width of the street at 10 meters. 
This width was increased to 11 meters by a royal decree of 3 August  1838. 
An order of 3 September 1843 declared the public utility of expansion to 20 meters to the right of the properties at numbers 115-121 to create the Cour du Havre.

The Gare Saint-Lazare was built in 1837. 
An alley, the "Impasse Bony", created in 1826 and located at the site of the Hotel Terminus, was used for unloading luggage.
The Cour de Rome, in front of the station on the west side, encompassed the old "Impasse d’Argenteuil", which opened onto the Rue du Rocher.

Notable buildings

Nos  27-29 (and nos  32-34, Rue de Châteaudun): Two notable buildings, decorated in the style of French architecture of the 16th century, built around 1840. Probably one of the most important collections of this style. The rear facades are visible from the rue de Châteaudun, whose extension in 1862 appears to have cut these buildings off from their garden.
No 58: Delaroche Hotel built in 1829 in the Tuscan style for the painter Paul Delaroche who lived there 10 years. The colors of the recent restoration claim to reproduce the original polychrome appearance.
No 60 : Parisian Home of the Duke of Bassano, where he and his wife died.
No 66 : Émile Zola bought an apartment here, where he installed his mistress Jeanne Rozerot.
No 87: Avenue du Coq: site of the former castle of the Porcheron family (13th  century), which gave its name to the district. Later, it became the property of the Le Cocq family, and gave its name to the impasse which was released in its place.
No 88: Hotel built for the PLM railway company in 1869 replacing the office of the Bridges and Highways department, built in 1788 by architect François-Nicolas Hole, aka Henry. From  1938 to 1999 it was the headquarters of the SNCF.
No 108: Hotel Concorde Opéra Paris, former Grand Hotel Terminus of the Gare Saint-Lazare, designed by architect Juste Lisch to welcome visitors to the Exposition Universelle (1889).
Nos 113-115: Brasserie Mollard: The interior, dated 1894, is by the architect Édouard Niermans. The ceramic tables are by M. Simas.
No 119: A fast food institution to teach McDonald's employees replaced a Bavarian tavern the Roi de la Bière, with a sign dating it to 1910, whose original façade has been preserved.

References
Notes

Citations

Sources

External links
 Histoire de Paris rue par rue, maison par maison, Charles Lefeuve, 1875 (http://www.paris-pittoresque.com/rues/161.htm)